Celil Nalçakan (born 10 June 1978) is a Turkish actor and Singer.

Life and career
Nalçakan was born on 10 June 1978 in Sivas. His mother was a teacher and his father was an electrical technician. He has a younger sister. After graduating from high school, he enrolled in the Geological Engineering department at Sivas Cumhuriyet University. However, after 7 years, he left the school and joined the Sivas State Theatre. Later, he started studying tourism and hotel management at Balıkesir University, but continued with his theatre studies there as well. He passed Türvak's exam and settled in Istanbul and started studying acting there.

He started his career in 2006 by making his television debut in the popular series Sıla. He then had supporting roles in the series Kış Masalı and Hanımın Çiftliği which based from classic novel but came to prominence with his role in Bitmeyen Şarkı. He briefly appeared in the series İntikam adaptation of Revenge, before doing a program titled Şişenin Dibi with Algı Eke on netd.com. 

Between 2015 and 2017, he played the role of Zülfikar in the series Poyraz Karayel and spin off film Poyraz Karayel: Küresel Sermaye. As of 2021, he has been cast in a leading role in the youth series Kardeşlerim, which is set to premiere on ATV.He appeared in many popular films.

Filmography

References

External links 
 
 

Living people
1978 births
Turkish male television actors
Turkish male film actors
People from Sivas